Wickles originated in Dadeville, Alabama. Wickles offers an original spicy pickle along with other signature products such as original relish, green jalapeno relish, red jalapeno relish, pickled okra, garden mix and their new dirty dill pickles line.

The company was founded in 1998 by brothers Trey and Will Sims and a third partner Andy Anderson, using a secret 70-year-old family recipe that differentiates Wickles products from all others. A custom blend of spices and ingredients makes their products "wickedly delicious". The recipe is a family secret that until a few years ago was just used for family and friends who were lucky enough to get a jar. In 2009 Wickles products were available across the United States.

Celebrity chef Emeril Lagasse has used the Wickles pickles on hamburgers. Alabama restaurateur Bob Baumhower offers "fried Wickles" at his restaurants. Rachael Ray also featured Wickles relish in a special sauce while making her Big Smacker Daym Drop Burger.

In April 2015, Wickles original pickle was selected as winner of AL.com's Alabama Food Bracket competition. This was a run-off against 32 other products that are of Alabama origin. Wickles won 52.5 percent of the final round's 10,917 votes.

References

External links

Food and drink companies based in Alabama
Food and drink companies established in 1998
Cuisine of the Southern United States
Pickles
Tallapoosa County, Alabama
1998 establishments in Alabama
Condiment companies of the United States